Grayson is an unincorporated community in Clinton County, in the U.S. state of Missouri. It was listed as a census-designated place (CDP) prior to the 2020 census.

The community is on US Route 169 four miles north of Trimble and approximately six miles west-southwest of Plattsburg. The Smithville Reservoir on the Little Platte River is about 3.5 miles to the east.

Demographics

History
Grayson was platted in 1871, and named after the maiden name of the wife of the original owner of the town site. A variant name was Graysonville. A post office called Graysonville was established in 1871, the name was changed to Grayson in 1882, and the post office closed in 1954.

References

Unincorporated communities in Clinton County, Missouri
Unincorporated communities in Missouri
Census-designated places in Clinton County, Missouri
Census-designated places in Missouri